Harvey A. Wilder (February 17, 1907 – March 15, 1968) was an American farmer and politician.

Wilder was born in Minnesota and graduated from Crookston High School in Crookston, Minnesota. He went to the Northwestern Agricultural College (now University of Minnesota Crookston) in Crookston, Minnesota. Wilder lived in Crookston, Minnesota with his wife and family and was a farmer. He served in the Minnesota National Guard during World War II and the Korean War. Wilder served on the Crookston City Council and also served in the Minnesota House of Representatives from 1957 to 1966. He died in Polk County, Minnesota.

References

1907 births
1968 deaths
People from Crookston, Minnesota
Farmers from Minnesota
Minnesota National Guard personnel
University of Minnesota Crookston alumni
Minnesota city council members
Members of the Minnesota House of Representatives